RNAS Inskip, or as it was otherwise known HMS Nightjar, is a former Fleet Air Arm airfield near the village of Inskip, Lancashire, England at . In the 60's and 70's it was a Royal Navy transmitting station known as HMS INSKIP. It is now used as a military high frequency radio transmitting station.ow

In the 1980s there were Marconi 50 kW transmitters operating in the (Very Low Frequency (VLF) band, transmitting Morse code to ships close to the United Kingdom.

For long distance work, the shortwave bands were used, again transmitting Morse to ships mostly based on Marconi transmitters, typically 10 kW or less. The same information would be transmitted on different frequencies and it was the ship's responsibility to find the correct frequency to monitor. This was because of the different propagation characteristics of the various frequencies used.

History
The following units were based at RNAS Inskip:
 735 Naval Air Squadron formed here on 1 August 1943, staying here until 18 March 1944. The unit flew the Fairey Swordfish I & II and the Avro Anson I
 737 Naval Air Squadron reformed here on 15 March 1944, staying until 28 August 1944. The unit flew Swordfish's and Anson's
 747 Naval Air Squadron between 9 June 1943 and 26 January 1944 using the Fairey Albacore, Anson, Fairey Barracuda, Swordfish and Supermarine Walrus
 760 Naval Air Squadron reformed here on 1 May 1944, staying until 1 November 1944 when the squadron was disbanded. It flew the Hawker Sea Hurricane IIc
 A detachment of 762 Naval Air Squadron from 20 June 1945 with the Airspeed Oxford
 763 Naval Air Squadron reformed here on 14 April 1944, staying until 31 July 1945 when the squadron was disbanded. It flew the Grumman Avenger, Anson and Swordfish
 766 Naval Air Squadron between 7 July 1943 and 20 January 1945 as part of No. 1 Naval Operational Training Unit flying Swordfish's, Albacore's, Fulmar's, Anson's, Boulton Paul Defiant's, Sea Hurricane IIC's, Fireflies, Oxford's and Miles Master's
 'Z' Flight of 787 Naval Air Squadron between 16 November 1943 and 14 January 1944 with the Swordfish, Fulmar I and Sea Hurricane
 811 Naval Air Squadron between 12 December 1944 and 12 January 1944 with the Swordfish and the Grumman Wildcat
 813 Naval Air Squadron between 20 January and 15 February 1944 with the Swordfish
 816 Naval Air Squadron between 11 August and 11 October 1945 with the Firefly
 819 Naval Air Squadron between 27 September and 15 October 1943 with the Swordfish and the Wildcat
 825 Naval Air Squadron between 14 November and 18 December 1943 with the Swordfish and Sea Hurricane IIc
 828 Naval Air Squadron between 10 February and 5 March 1945 with the Avenger
 838 Naval Air Squadron between 6 February and 18 March 1944 with the Swordfish
 1791 Naval Air Squadron between 19 April and 18 June 1945 with the Firefly
 1792 Naval Air Squadron between 15 June and 29 August 1945 with the Firefly INF

The runway was demolished in the 1970s. The concrete from it was used to help build the M55 motorway, from which the aerials can be clearly seen. Today only the smaller taxiways exist as proof of the airfield's former existence.

Sea Cadet Training Centre (SCTC) Inskip, a national training centre to the Sea Cadet Corps, was situated on the same site until its closure on 31 January 2010.

Current use

Transmitter station 
The site is home to a high frequency transmitter station forming part of the Defence High Frequency Communications Service. The station is operated by Babcock International Group on behalf of the Ministry of Defence. Prior to 2003 the site was operated by the Royal Navy.

Air Training Corps 
In January 2012 the former SCTC Inskip reopened as the Inskip Cadet Centre and is now the new home of Cumbria & Lancashire Wing, Air Training Corps. Appropriately the Wing Headquarters Offices are situated in what was the old Watch Tower (control tower) when RNAS Inskip was a flying station.

References

Citations

Bibliography

Inskip
RNAS Inskip
Buildings and structures in the Borough of Wyre
The Fylde